This is a list of cancelled games for the Sega Mega Drive/Genesis.

List 
There are currently  games on this list.

See also 
 List of Sega Genesis games
 Lists of video games

Notes

References 

Sega Genesis
Sega Genesis